Arab Republic may refer to:

Current states
 Arab Republic of Egypt, commonly known as Egypt
 Syrian Arab Republic, commonly known as Syria
 Sahrawi Arab Democratic Republic, a partially recognized state, which claims the territory of Western Sahara

Former states
 United Arab Republic (1958–1971)
 Federation of Arab Republics (1972–1977)
 Libyan Arab Republic (1969–1977)
 Yemen Arab Republic (1962–1990)
 Libyan Arab Jamahiriya (1977-2011)

Proposed states
 Arab Islamic Republic (1974)